Havildar Joginder Singh, AC (30 November 1922 - 24 April 1956) was an Indian Army Non Commissioned Officer (NCO) who was awarded India's highest peace time military decoration Ashoka Chakra for his gallant act in Nagaland.

Early life
Havildar Joginder Singh was born on 30 November 1922 in village Datevas of Bathinda District, Punjab. His father's name was Sardar Sham Singh who was a poor farmer. Belonging to a financially poor family, he did not get the opportunity of an education.

Military career
Havildar Joginder Singh was enrolled in the Indian Army on 30 November 1940 at the young age of 18. After completion of his military training, he was posted to 2 Sikh Regiment. During his Army education, he received the first grade in Indian Army and Map Reading courses.  He also attended the Engineer Platoon Commander Course and received ‘BY’ Grading. During his service, he also served in various places like Greece and Africa.

Naga Hills Encounter
In April 1956, Havildar Joginder Singh was posted in Khujami district of Nagaland serving in the 2 Sikh Regiment. The Naga rebellion was at its peak during this time with insurgents hidden at various positions in the hills with an aim to suppress the military movement.  On the fateful day of 24 April 1956, Singh was leading a three jeep convoy carrying stores for a forward post at Phek, in the Naga Hills. After crossing milestone 16, insurgents who had set up traps on the curved mountainous track suddenly opened fire and charged the convoy with light machine guns. Havildar Joginder got hit by one of the bullets in his right leg. Undeterred by the gunshot, he jumped out of the jeep and ran towards the militants to attack. Following his brave act, six of his soldiers also braved out of the vehicles and moved forward to attack the militants. Havlidar Joginder was just 25 meters short of the enemy when a bullet hit him in the stomach. Undeterred once again, in spite of being deeply wounded he continued to move towards the enemy by crawling on the ground and finally hit the enemy's post by two hand grenades. This shot silenced the enemy fire and his fellow soldiers succeeded in destroying the enemy post which was always a hurdle for the movement of the Indian Army. Havildar Joginder Singh succumbed to his injuries and breathed his last as a brave martyr of the Indian Army. Havildar Joginder's act of leading the encounter with valour and determination was the inspiration for his men to achieve their objective successfully.

Ashoka Chakra awardee
For his act of bravery and extreme valour he was posthumously awarded India's highest peace time military decoration Ashoka Chakra.

References

1922 births
1956 deaths
Indian Army personnel
Recipients of the Ashoka Chakra (military decoration)